The Cambodian Usurpation of 1811–1812 was when an army from Siam (Thailand) supported Ang Snguon after he overthrew his brother Ang Chan; but Vietnam sent a large army to help reinstate Ang Chan at Phnom Penh.

Background 
In 1769, King Taksin of Thonburi sent messages to King Ang Ton of Cambodia, urging him to send tributes to Siam and submit. King Ang Ton refused. In 1771, King Taksin ordered Phraya Yommaraj (later King Rama I) to lead troops of 10,000 men to invade Cambodia through Battambang, Siemreap and Pursat to attack Oudong and to bring the pro-Siamese Prince Ang Non to the Cambodian throne. King Taksin himself with the general Chen Lian (陳聯) led the fleet to attack Hà Tiên, leading to the Siamese-Vietnamese War (1769–1773). King Ang Ton fled to Saigon under the protection of the Nguyen Lord Nguyễn Phúc Thuần. Nguyễn Phúc Thuần sent the general Nguyễn Cửu Đàm to aid against the Siamese invasions. The Siamese were repelled with Prince Ang Non stayed behind at Kampot. Also in 1771, the Tây Sơn Rebellion arose against the rule of Nguyen Lords. King Ang Ton returned to Cambodia and negotiated with Ang Non. Ang Ton abdicated the Cambodian throne in 1775 in favor of Ang Non who became the new King of Cambodia. However, Ang Ton died in 1777, leaving Ang Non in full power in Cambodia. Cambodian nobles, led by Chauvea Tolaha Mu and his brother Oknha Decho Then, were dissatisfied with King Ang Non's pro-Siamese stance. Tolaha Mu sought support from Nguyễn Phúc Ánh who had been fighting against the Tây Sơn from Saigon. Nguyễn Phúc Ánh sent Vietnamese army to support Tolaha Mu, who arrested and murdered King Ang Non in 1779. Tolaha Mu placed a four-year-old son of Ang Ton named Ang Eng as the new king of Cambodia with himself as the regent. King Taksin, upon learning about the Cambodian regicide, was furious at Oknha Youmreach Baen who was the protector of King Ang Non. Taksin ordered Youmreach Baen arrested and imprisoned at Thonburi but Chao Phraya Chakri secured his pardon and release.

In 1782, Chao Phraya Chakri became King Rama I of the Chakri dynasty. Oknha Youmreach Baen and Oknha Kralahom Pok successfully staged a coup and killed Tolaha Mu in 1782. However, the ensuing confusion and civil war in Cambodia prompted Youmreach Baen and Kralahom Pok to bring the young king Ang Eng and his elder sisters Princess Ang Y and Ang Pen to Bangkok. King Rama I took care of King Ang Eng as his adopted son, while Princesses Ang Y and Ang Pen became consorts of Prince Surasinghanat. In Cambodia, Decho Then, the younger brother of Tolaha Mu, declared himself the Tolaha or regent and took power under the support of the Tây Sơn. King Rama I appointed Youmreach Baen as Chao Phraya Aphaiphubet the regent of Cambodia. Chao Phraya Aphaiphubet Baen managed to oust Decho Then in 1789 and took control of whole Cambodia for Siam. King Rama I kept Ang Eng in Bangkok away from Cambodian political conflicts. Aphaiphubet Baen was the regent of Cambodia for twelve years until 1794 when King Rama I allowed Ang Eng to assume personal rule in Cambodia. King Rama I also rewarded Aphaiphubet Baen with the northwestern part of Cambodia including Battambang and Siemreap for Aphaiphubet Baen to govern under direct Siamese suzerainty, thus annexing those territories into Siam proper.

King Ang Eng died in 1796, leaving four sons Princes Ang Chan, Ang Sngoun, Ang Em and Ang Duong. Kralahom Pok, who had become Tolaha Pok, served as the regent of Cambodia until 1806 when he brought the four young Cambodian princes to visit King Rama I at Bangkok. Tolaha Pok fell ill and died at Bangkok. King Rama I installed Ang Chan as the new King of Cambodia in 1806. Emperor Gia Long of the Vietnamese Nguyen dynasty also invested Ang Chan as the King of Cambodia next year in 1807. The new king Ang Chan asked for the permissions for his aunts Princesses Ang Y and Ang Pen to return to Cambodia. King Rama I refused, citing that the princesses were already mothers of daughters of the late Prince Surasinghanat. On an occasion, Ang Chan visited King Rama I before returning to Cambodia. However, Ang Chan entered the royal hall without permission and prerequisite ceremonies. King Rama I strongly rebuked Ang Chan in front of Siamese officials. In 1808, Oknha Decho Meng the governor of Kampong Svay rebelled against King Ang Chan.

King Rama I passed away in 1809. Chao Phraya Aphaiphubet also died the same year. King Ang Chan did not attend the funeral of King Rama I at Bangkok and instead sent his younger brothers Ang Sngoun and Ang Em, along with Cambodian nobles Oknha Chakrey Pen and Oknha Kralahom Moeung, to go to Bangkok. King Rama II granted Ang Sngoun and Ang Em the titles of Uprayorach (viceroy) and Ouparach (deputy viceroy), respectively. In the same year, the Burmese invaded Phuket and King Rama II requested supporting troops from Cambodia to defend Bangkok. King Ang Chan, however, did not comply. Chakrey Pen and Kralahom Moeung, the two pro-Siamese Cambodian ministers, then organized troops to be sent to Bangkok without the permission of the Cambodian king. Ang Chan then had Chakrey Pen and Kralahom Moeung executed for sedition on September 14, 1810. Tension arose between Ang Chan and the Siamese court. Ang Chan sent Oknha Bovorneayok to request military aid from the Vietnamese. Nguyễn Văn Nhơn the governor of Saigon led the Vietnamese troops of 1,000 men to take defensive position at Longvek against possible Siamese offensives. Prince Senanurak of the Front Palace ordered Phraya Rongmueang to station Siamese troops at Battambang. The Siamese-Vietnamese standoff lasted for four months until Nguyễn Văn Nhơn pulled the troops back to Saigon in January 1811 but Phraya Rongmueang remained in Battambang.

Siamese-Vietnamese standoff 
In February 1811, Prince Ang Sngoun the Uprayorach and younger brother of Ang Chan, left the royal city of Oudong at night along with a group of pro-Siamese mandarins. Ang Sngoun rallied troops at Pursat. Ang Chan sent delegates to visit his brother Ang Sngoun at Pursat, urging him to return to Oudong but to no avail. Ang Chan then decided to ask for Vietnamese support again. Nguyễn Văn Nhơn the governor of Saigon sent Nguyễn Văn Thoại to lead Vietnamese forces of 500 men to station at Longvek. The Siamese court sent Chao Phraya Yommaraj Noi to Battambang to lead the Siamese expedition into Cambodia to settle the princely struggle issues. King Ang Chan ordered his generals Oknha Bovorneayok and Oknha Thommeadecho to defend Kampong Chhnang.

Chao Phraya Yommaraj Noi sent his delegates to negotiate with Ang Chan at Oudong but Ang Chan gave no responses. Yommaraj Noi, along with Phraya Rongmueang at Battambang, decided to march the Siamese army of 5,000 men down, taking Prince Ang Sngoun from Pursat to attack Kampong Chhnang in April 1812, leading to the Battle of Kampong Chhnang. The Cambodians were outnumbered as Oknha Bovorneayok and Oknha Thommeadecho sent a man to inform King Ang Chan at Oudong that the Siamese came in large numbers. Ang Chan then decided to leave Oudong on April 9, 1812, along with the royal family to take refuge in Phnom Penh. Nguyễn Văn Thoại provided boat vessels for the Cambodian king and his family to travel at Phnom Penh. Princes Ang Em and Ang Duong, two other younger brothers of Ang Chan, decided not to join the king in flight and defected and fled back to the Siamese on April 10. Nguyễn Văn Nhơn then invited Ang Chan to seek safety shelter in Saigon. The Cambodian king and his entourage reached Saigon on April 25, 1812.

Yommaraj Noi and the Siamese army arrived in Oudong to find out that the Cambodian king had escaped to Phnom Penh. The Siamese followed Ang Chan to Phnom Penh but Ang Chan and his retinue had already reached Saigon. Chao Phraya Yommaraj Noi sent reconciliatory messages to Ang Chan and Nguyễn Văn Nhơn, declaring that the Siamese intention was to peacefully settle the conflicts. Both Ang Chan and Nguyễn Văn Nhơn did not respond. Nguyễn Văn Nhơn constructed a lavish place for Ang Chan and his family to reside in Saigon. Ang Chan sent Oknha Bovorneayok to Huế as an envoy to Emperor Gia Long who awarded Ang Chan with large sum of money and rice. Yommaraj Noi had been waiting for responses at Oudong. He then decided that when the dry season was over the waters would be high, suitable for Vietnamese fleet to arrive and engage. For his strategically inferior position, Yommaraj Noi burnt down and destroyed Oudong and Phnom Penh to prevent the Vietnamese from taking foothold in these cities and took the pro-Siamese Cambodian Princes Ang Sgnoun, Ang Em and Ang Duong back to Bangkok with him. Thousands of Cambodians were deported to Siamese-controlled northwest Cambodia.

Aftermath and consequences 
Dowager Empress Hiếu Khang the mother of Emperor Gia Long died in 1811. On February 15, 1812, King Rama II dispatched a mission to Huế to attend the funeral. Also, the matter of Cambodian princely conflicts was raised by Siamese court through the Siamese envoy to Gia Long. The Siamese envoy told Gia Long that King Ang Chan had always been rebellious to Siam in spite of Siamese fair treatment on Ang Chan. Gia Long replied that the Prince Ang Sngoun was responsible for the incidents because he stirred up the events and was not a loyal subject to his elder brother who was also his overlord. Siamese court was then convinced that Gia Long was in support of Ang Chan. However, going into full-scale war with Vietnam was then untimely due to prospective Burmese threats from the West. Bangkok court sent another mission to Huế on January 4, 1813. Gia Long declared that he would restore the Cambodian King Ang Chan to the throne. In April 1813, Gia Long ordered Lê Văn Duyệt and Ngô Nhân Tịnh to bring troops from Huế to Saigon to escort Ang Chan back to Cambodia. In May, Lê Văn Duyệt led the Vietnamese troop of 13,000 men to bring Ang Chan back to Phnom Penh with the Siamese envoys presented in the entourage as witnesses.

When King Ang Chan returned to Phnom Penh, both Oudong and Phnom Penh had already been destroyed by the Siamese. After the Siamese envoys and officials had returned to Battambang, Lê Văn Duyệt proposed to build a new citadel and royal city for Ang Chan. Ang Chan preferred Phnom Penh over Oudong. While Oudong was susceptible to Siamese attacks, Phnom Penh was located riverine and the Vietnamese fleets could accessibly arrive in defense in case of future Siamese attacks. Lê Văn Duyệt then constructed a new citadel for Ang Chan at Phnom Penh called "Banteay Keav". Lê Văn Duyệt constructed another citadel at Lvea Aem as a Vietnamese garrison. He also ordered the construction of a shrine at Chroy Changvar dedicated to Emperor Gia Long. Nguyễn Văn Thoại was appointed as bảo hộ or Protector of Cambodia and was assigned with Vietnamese troops of 1,500 men to guard King Ang Chan. Ang Chan also rewarded his meritorious subjects with high positions, with Oknha Bovorneayok becoming Chakrey Suat and Tuan Pha, a Cham general, becoming the Youmreach.

King Ang Chan continued to send tributes to the Siamese court annually but also sent tributes to Huế triennially. Cambodia then came under de facto Vietnamese influence, which would remain so until the Siamese-Vietnamese War (1841-1845) for about thirty years. Twice a month, Ang Chan and his officials would dress in Vietnamese attire and conduct sacrifices at the Vietnamese shrine at Chroy Changvar to worship Emperor Gia Long.

Cambodian attempt to reclaim Battambang (1815) 
In 1815, Ang Chan sent Youmreach Tuan Pha and Oknha Thommeadecho to successfully oust Oknha Decho Meng the rebellious governor of Kampong Svay. Ang Chan consulted Nguyễn Văn Thoại about the matter of Battambang. Battambang was held by the Siamese who used Battambang as an outpost and base for many incursions into Cambodia. The Siamese should be expelled from Battambang. Nguyễn Văn Thoại suggested that Ang Chan should send armies to Battambang to evaluate the situation. King Ang Chan then ordered Samdech Chauponhea Tei to lead Cambodian army to Battambang to collect stalactites and bat guano as taxes. Samdech Chauponhea Tei led the Cambodian army to Battambang in 1815 and sent Oknha Surkealok the governor of Pursat ahead as vanguard. Phraya Aphaiphubet Ros the governor of Battambang, who was the son of Chaophraya Aphaiphubet Baen, sent counter-offensive army to defeat Oknha Surkealok, who was captured to Bangkok. Samdech Chauponhea Tei then decided to retreat.

King Rama II responded by having regiments from Bangkok and Nakhon Ratchasima stationed at Battambang under the command of his cousin the Prince Kromma Khun Itsaranurak and informed Gia Long that the Vietnamese viceroy had instigated the Cambodian to invade Battambang. Gia Long sent his delegate to conduct investigation in Cambodia and found Samdech Chauponhea Tei guilty. King Ang Chan then ordered Samdech Chauponhea Tei arrested and sent to Vietnamese court for trial. Samdech Chauponhea Tei told the Vietnamese court that he marched Cambodian army to Battambang with peaceful intentions only to collect taxes. The Vietnamese sent Samdech Chauponhea Tei back to King Ang Chan for punishment and urged the Bangkok court to punish the governor of Battambang also for his over-reaction.

See also
Cambodian rebellion (1820)
Cambodian rebellion (1840)

Notes
Footnote

Citations

References
A History of Cambodia By David P. Chandler
In Search of Southeast Asia By David P. Chandler, David Joel Steinberg

External links 
List of the Wars of Cambodia

Conflicts in 1811
Conflicts in 1812
19th-century rebellions
Wars involving the Rattanakosin Kingdom
Wars involving Cambodia
Military history of Nguyen Vietnam
19th century in Cambodia
19th century in Siam
1811 in Asia
1812 in Asia
1811 in Siam
1811 in Cambodia
1811 in Vietnam
1812 in Siam
1812 in Cambodia
1812 in Vietnam
1810s in Siam